The Oriental hobby (Falco severus) is a species of falcon typically 27–30 cm long. It can be found in the northern parts of the Indian Subcontinent, across the eastern Himalayas and ranges southwards through Indochina to Australasia. It has been recorded as a vagrant from Malaysia.

Diet and habitats
The Oriental hobby feeds mainly on insects and birds, and has in rare instances been observed as catching bats. Its typical habitats are lowland forested areas and woodland. It nests in used nest of other birds either in trees, on building ledges or on cliffs.

Identification
Adult is rich chestnut below, bluish-grey above with a black hood and pale throat. Juvenile has black streaks on its rufous chest and has a mottled back.

References

External links
 BirdLife Species Factsheet

Oriental hobby
Birds of Southeast Asia
Oriental hobby